Blondie on a Budget is a 1940 American comedy film directed by Frank R. Strayer and starring Penny Singleton, Arthur Lake and Rita Hayworth. It is the fifth entry into the long-running Blondie series of films, which ran between 1938 and 1950.

Plot

Blondie Bumstead is having trouble balancing the family budget, particularly as she wants to buy a new fur coat. Her husband Dagwood also needs money for the membership fee of a fishing club he wants to join. Blondie becomes jealous when she finds Dagwood with an overfamiliar old friend, Joan Forrester, and begins to suspect that they are having an affair. After Dagwood wins money in a competition he decides to buy Blondie a fur coat, but uses Joan to try it on for size. Blondie sees them in the shop together and mistakenly thinks he is buying it for Joan. She decides to leave Dagwood for good, only to have a last minute change of heart.

Main cast

References

Bibliography
 Young, Nancy K. & Young, William H. World War II and the Postwar Years in America: A Historical and Cultural Encyclopedia. ABC-CLIO, 2010.

External links
 
 
 
 

1940 films
American black-and-white films
1940 comedy films
1940s English-language films
Films directed by Frank R. Strayer
Columbia Pictures films
Blondie (film series) films
Films scored by Leigh Harline
1940s American films